Zakrzewo may refer to:

Zakrzewo, Złotów County in Greater Poland Voivodeship (west-central Poland)
Zakrzewo, Gmina Waganiec in Kuyavian-Pomeranian Voivodeship (north-central Poland)
Zakrzewo, Gmina Zakrzewo in Kuyavian-Pomeranian Voivodeship (north-central Poland)
Zakrzewo, Chełmno County in Kuyavian-Pomeranian Voivodeship (north-central Poland)
Zakrzewo, Grudziądz County in Kuyavian-Pomeranian Voivodeship (north-central Poland)
Zakrzewo, Lipno County in Kuyavian-Pomeranian Voivodeship (north-central Poland)
Zakrzewo, Gmina Baruchowo in Kuyavian-Pomeranian Voivodeship (north-central Poland)
Zakrzewo, Gmina Lubień Kujawski in Kuyavian-Pomeranian Voivodeship (north-central Poland)
Zakrzewo, Bielsk County in Podlaskie Voivodeship (north-east Poland)
Zakrzewo, Grajewo County in Podlaskie Voivodeship (north-east Poland)
Zakrzewo, Maków County in Masovian Voivodeship (east-central Poland)
Zakrzewo, Płock County in Masovian Voivodeship (east-central Poland)
Zakrzewo, Gniezno County in Greater Poland Voivodeship (west-central Poland)
Zakrzewo, Koło County in Greater Poland Voivodeship (west-central Poland)
Zakrzewo, Poznań County in Greater Poland Voivodeship (west-central Poland)
Zakrzewo, Rawicz County in Greater Poland Voivodeship (west-central Poland)
Zakrzewo, Wągrowiec County in Greater Poland Voivodeship (west-central Poland)
Zakrzewo, Wolsztyn County in Greater Poland Voivodeship (west-central Poland)
Zakrzewo, Śrem County in Greater Poland Voivodeship (west-central Poland)
Zakrzewo, Pomeranian Voivodeship (north Poland)
Zakrzewo, Działdowo County in Warmian-Masurian Voivodeship (north Poland)
Zakrzewo, Nidzica County in Warmian-Masurian Voivodeship (north Poland)
Zakrzewo, West Pomeranian Voivodeship (north-west Poland)